The Connecticut Distance Learning Consortium (CTDLC) was a State of Connecticut agency that supported online learning in Connecticut. Although not a college, it hosted and provided services to Connecticut's colleges and universities to make it easier for them to offer online courses and degree programs.  They also provided the same services for institutions outside the state of Connecticut. CTDLC shut down in 2018 due to lack of profitability.

History
The Consortium was created in October 1996 when over thirty colleges and universities met and agreed that Connecticut needed to systematically mount distance deliverable education.

In 2018, Charter Oak State College president Ed Klonoski said the following about CTDLC closing: “the current economic landscape makes it tough to achieve sufficient profitability to make the investments in technology and talent that [the Consortium's] service set requires."

Student Services
The CTDLC gave students information about online learning, including:

 Listing of all online courses available from Connecticut's colleges and universities, including registration, tuition & fees, and pre-requisites
 Listing of all online degree programs available at Connecticut's college and universities
 Listing of all online certificate programs available at Connecticut's college and universities
 Financial Aid information
 Online tutoring (not offered at all colleges)
 Links to all of the Connecticut's colleges and universities that offer online education
 Free Sample online course
 General facts and information about online learning
 Online help desk
 Hosting of Learning Management Systems

Faculty Services
The CTDLC website offers a variety of services for faculty, including training programs and grant opportunities.

Business Services
The CTDLC was available to help the business community with their online needs, including building web applications and converting face-to-face training into e-learning.

References

State agencies of Connecticut
Public education in Connecticut
Newington, Connecticut